Jombok Hoas is a non-profit adventure retreat run by the Adventist Development and Relief Agency (ADRA) situated in forest in the small village of Sry Tnong (near the town of Rovieng) in Preah Vihear Province, Cambodia.

Description 
The centre lies roughly between Kampong Thom and Tbeng Mean Chey, the capitals of Kampong Thom Province and Preah Vihear provinces respectively. It is about five or six hours by car from Phnom Penh. It lies on the northern border of the Bung Pey wildlife sanctuary. The vegetation surrounding the facility is a mixture of primary and secondary forest. 

Jombok Hoas has many physical activities and challenges including abseiling, high ropes course, zip-line, high swing, a cable bridge, giant spider web and others. There are also other exercises which emphasize problem solving skills. Leadership and team building skills are emphasized, as well as personal growth and self-confidence. It is also meant to be enjoyable!

See also 
 Adventist Development and Relief Agency

External links 
 ADRA Cambodia entry for Jombok Hoas

Organisations based in Cambodia
Seventh-day Adventist Church in Asia